Makalu may refer to:
Makalu, Himalayan mountain, fifth-highest in the world
Makalu, Sankhuwasabha, a rural municipality in Sankhuwasabha
Makalu, Nepal
UP Makalu, a German paraglider design, named for the mountain